Cyromazine is a triazine insect growth regulator used as an insecticide.  It is a cyclopropyl derivative of melamine.  Cyromazine works by affecting the nervous system of the immature larval stages of certain insects.

In veterinary medicine, cyromazine is used as an ectoparasiticide.

Regulation
The Food Safety and Inspection Service (FSIS) of the United States Department of Agriculture (USDA) provides a test method for analyzing cyromazine and melamine in animal tissues in its Chemistry Laboratory Guidebook which "contains test methods used by FSIS Laboratories to support the Agency's inspection program, ensuring that meat, poultry, and egg products are safe, wholesome and accurately labeled." In 1999, in a proposed rule published in the Federal Register regarding cyromazine residue, the United States Environmental Protection Agency (EPA) proposed "remov[ing] melamine, a metabolite of cyromazine from the tolerance expression since it is no longer considered a residue of concern."

References

Insecticides
Triazines
Cyclopropanes